This is a list of South African television related events from 2011.

Events
12 May - Disney XD is launched for the very first time in South Africa.
4 October - Dave van Vuuren wins the seventh season of Idols South Africa.

Debuts

International
25 April -  Fly Girls (Vuzu)
8 July -  Raising Hope (M-Net)
/ The Octonauts (M-Net)
 Scaredy Squirrel (M-Net)
// The Amazing World of Gumball (Cartoon Network)

Changes of network affiliation

Television shows

1980s
Good Morning South Africa (1985–present)
Carte Blanche (1988–present)

1990s
Top Billing (1992–present)
Generations (1994–present)
Isidingo (1998–present)

2000s
Idols South Africa (2002–present)
Rhythm City (2007–present)
SA's Got Talent (2009–present)

2010s
The Wild (2011–2013)

New channels
12 May - Disney XD

Ending this year

Births

Deaths

See also
2011 in South Africa